600 Main Street is a historic commercial building located in Barnstable, Massachusetts.

Description and history 
It is a -story, wood-framed building whose gable roof is pierced by a three-part dormer surrounded by a balustrade. The building, constructed in 1920, has retained almost all of its original details, more so than the nearly-identical building at 595 Main Street, which has not. The building is notable as a high quality local example of commercial Colonial Revival architecture, and is typical of the area's gradual transformation into a commercial area in the early 20th century.

The building was listed on the National Register of Historic Places on March 13, 1987.

See also
National Register of Historic Places listings in Barnstable County, Massachusetts

References

Commercial buildings on the National Register of Historic Places in Massachusetts
Buildings and structures in Barnstable, Massachusetts
National Register of Historic Places in Barnstable, Massachusetts
Commercial buildings completed in 1920
Colonial Revival architecture in Massachusetts